The Arbitration Institute of the Stockholm Chamber of Commerce is an institution for international arbitration affiliated with the Stockholm Chamber of commerce in Sweden.

External links

Website of the Arbitration Institute of the Stockholm Chamber of Commerce: 
English - 

Arbitration courts and tribunals